Daniil Dmitriyevich Khudyakov (born 9 January 2004) is a Russian football player who plays for FC Lokomotiv Moscow.

Club career
He made his debut in the Russian Premier League for FC Lokomotiv Moscow on 25 September 2021 in a game against FC Khimki. He came on as a substitute in the second half after the starting goalkeeper Guilherme was sent off and kept the clean sheet for the remaining 42 minutes of play. He made his European debut on 25 November 2021 in an Europa League game against Lazio.

Career statistics

References

External links
 
 
 

2004 births
Footballers from Moscow
Living people
Russian footballers
Russia youth international footballers
Russia under-21 international footballers
Association football goalkeepers
FC Lokomotiv Moscow players
Russian Premier League players
Russian Second League players